Ernst Bauer may refer to:

 Ernst Bauer (Kapitän zur See) (1914–1988), German U-boat commander during World War II
 Ernst G. Bauer (born 1928), German-American physicist